Sérgio Luiz Viotti (14 March 192726 July 2009) was a Brazilian actor and television director.

Biography
Viotti was born in São Paulo. He resided in London, England between 1949 and 1958, where he worked for BBC Radio. He worked as a radio broadcaster and a dance and opera critic while at the BBC.

Viotti returned to Brazil in 1958. In 1958, he was asked by Antunes Filho to direct, Viagem a Três, by Jean de Létraz, which marked his entry into directing. His career as an actor first began in 1961, when he appeared in the theater production of The Connection O Contato by American playwright Jack Gelber. His work on O Cantanto earned Viotti a best new actor award from the Prêmio Associação Brasileira de Críticos Teatrais (Brazilian Theater Critics Association). He also received acclaim for his work in the 1967 production of Queridinho by Charles Dyer.

In 1991, Viotti celebrated his then 30-year-long professional acting career by appearing in As idades do homem, compilation of William Shakespeare plays directed by Dorival Carper, who was also his life partner for 47 years until his death.

Viotti also worked on television in the telenovelas Terra Nostra, Meu Bem Meu Mal, Sinhá Moça and Xica da Silva.

His most recent work was as the character Manuel in the telenovela Duas Caras in 2007.

Death
Viotti was hospitalized on April 19, 2009, and remained in the hospital for the remainder of his life. He died from cardiac arrest at the Hospital Samaritano in São Paulo on July 26, 2009, at the age of 82. The actor was cremated at the Vila Alpina cemetery, which is located east of São Paulo.

Filmography

Film credits
1965: Um Ramo Para Luísa
1965: 22-2000 Cidade Aberta
1986: Angel Malo
1995: Sábado - Narrator

Television credits
1980: Dulcinéa Vai à Guerra (Rede Bandeirantes)
1986: Sinhá Moça - Frei José
1987: Corpo Santo (Rede Manchete) - Grego (Nicolas)
1988: O Primo Basílio - Conselheiro Acácio
1988: Olho por Olho - Eliseu (Rede Manchete)
1989: Kananga do Japão (Rede Manchete) - Saul
1990: Meu Bem, Meu Mal - Toledo
1990: Mico Preto - Plínio
1992: Despedida de Solteiro - Gabriel Chadade
1993: Olho no Olho - Jorginho
1995: História de Amor - Gregório Furtado
1995: Irmãos Coragem - Rafael Bastos
1996: Xica da Silva (Rede Manchete) - Conde da Barca
1997: Anjo Mau - Américo Abreu
1997: Por Amor e Ódio (Rede Record) - Frederico Saragoça
1999: Suave Veneno - Alceste
1999: Terra Nostra - Ivan Maurício
2001: Os Maias - Pai Vasques
2003: A Casa das Sete Mulheres - Padre Cordeiro
2004: Um Só Coração - Samuel
2006: JK - Adolpho Bloch
2007: Duas Caras - Manuel de Andrade (final appearance)

References

External links

1927 births
2009 deaths
Brazilian LGBT actors
Brazilian male stage actors
Brazilian male television actors
Brazilian male film actors
Brazilian theatre directors
Male actors from São Paulo
Brazilian expatriates in the United Kingdom
Brazilian people of Italian descent
BBC people